Koku Mensah Ahiaku (born 6 March 1963) is a Togolese former cyclist. He competed in the individual road race at the 1992 Summer Olympics.

References

External links
 

1963 births
Living people
Togolese male cyclists
Olympic cyclists of Togo
Cyclists at the 1992 Summer Olympics
Place of birth missing (living people)
21st-century Togolese people